In a series of legal disputes between SCO Group and Linux vendors and users, SCO alleged that its license agreements with IBM meant that source code IBM wrote and donated to be incorporated into Linux was added in violation of SCO's contractual rights. Members of the Linux community disagreed with SCO's claims; IBM, Novell, and Red Hat filed claims against SCO.

On August 10, 2007, a federal district court judge in SCO v. Novell ruled on summary judgment that Novell, not the SCO Group, was the rightful owner of the copyrights covering the Unix operating system. The court also ruled that "SCO is obligated to recognize Novell's waiver of SCO's claims against IBM and Sequent". After the ruling, Novell announced they had no interest in suing people over Unix and stated "We don't believe there is Unix in Linux". The final district court ruling, on November 20, 2008, affirmed the summary judgment, and added interest payments and a constructive trust.

On August 24, 2009, the U.S. Court of Appeals for the Tenth Circuit partially reversed the district court judgment. The appeals court remanded back to trial on the issues of copyright ownership and Novell's contractual waiver rights. The court upheld the $2,547,817 award granted to Novell for the 2003 Sun agreement.

On March 30, 2010, following a jury trial, Novell, and not The SCO Group, was unanimously found to be the owner of the UNIX and UnixWare copyrights. The SCO Group, through bankruptcy trustee Edward Cahn, decided to continue the lawsuit against IBM for causing a decline in SCO revenues.

On March 1, 2016, SCO's lawsuit against IBM was dismissed with prejudice; SCO filed an appeal later that month.

Overview
Unix is a major computer operating system, developed in the United States of America. Prior to the events of this case, the intellectual property rights (IP) in Unix were held by Unix System Laboratories (USL), part of AT&T, but the area of IP ownership was complex. By 2003, the rights in Unix had been transferred several times and there was dispute as to the correct owner in law. Also, some of the code within Unix had been written prior to the Copyright Act of 1976, or was developed by third parties, or was developed or licensed under different licenses existing at the time. The software company SCO Group (SCO), formerly Caldera International, asserted in 2003 that it was the owner of Unix, and that other Unix-type operating systems—particularly the free operating system Linux and other variants of Unix sold by competitor companies—were violating their intellectual property by using Unix code without a license in their works.

SCO initially claimed, and tried to assert, a legal means to litigate directly against all end-users of these operating systems, as well as the companies or groups providing them—potentially a very substantial case and one that would throw fear into the market about using them. However, it was unable to formulate such a case, since the Unix copyrights were weakly worded, there was no basis in patent law, and breach of trade secrets would only affect the one or few companies who might have been alleged to have disclosed trade secrets. Lacking grounds to sue all users generally, SCO dropped this aspect of its cases.

The assertions were heavily contested. Claims of SCO's own copyright violations of these other systems were raised, along with claims related to SCO being bound by, or violating, the GPL licence, under which SCO conducted business related to these systems. Claims were also made that the case was substantially financed and promoted by Microsoft and investment businesses with links to Microsoft; around that time (1998–2004 onwards), Microsoft was fiercely engaged in various FUD tactics such as its Get the facts campaign, that sought to undermine or discredit Linux as a possible competitor to its own Windows operating systems and server systems.

In the end, SCO launched only a few main legal cases—against IBM for improper disclosure and breach of copyright related to its AIX operating system, against Novell for interference (clouding the issue of ownership), against DaimlerChrysler for non-compliance with a demand to certify certain matters related to Unix usage, and against Linux business and former client AutoZone for violating SCO's rights by using Linux. Separately, the Linux company Red Hat also filed a legal claim against SCO for making false claims that affected its (Red Hat's) business, and to seek a court declaration that SCO had no ownership rights in Linux code.

In 2007, a court ruled in SCO v. Novell that Novell and not SCO was the owner of the Unix copyrights. , most of these cases have been resolved, or largely resolved, and none of the rulings have been in SCO's favor.

Timeline and major cases

At the beginning of 2003, SCO claimed that there had been "misappropriation of its UNIX System V code into Linux". However, the company refused to identify the specific segments of code, claiming that it was a secret which they would reveal only to the court. They did say that the code could be found in the SMP, RCU and a few other parts of the Linux kernel.

On 6 March 2003, they announced that they were suing IBM for $1 billion, claiming that IBM transferred SCO trade secrets into Linux. That amount later rose to $3 billion, and then again to $5 billion. May 2003—Novell publicly states that SCO does not own the AT&T Unix intellectual property in question, Novell does.

Some educated parties note that the USL v. BSDi case had shown that the Unix copyrights are weak and unenforceable. SCO has not claimed patent infringement, as according to the US Patent and Trademark Office database, no AT&T or Novell patent was ever assigned to SCO. The UNIX trademark was not owned by SCO. That left arguing over trade secrets, which, after some opposition, was hard to take beyond a breach of contract between SCO and IBM, and consequentially, a claim only against IBM. SCO was looking for something directed at the greater Linux community, and has since explicitly dropped all trade secret claims from their case.

SCO now had little legal ground at this point and therefore began numerous legal claims and threats against many of the major names in the computer industry, including IBM, Hewlett-Packard, Microsoft, Novell, Silicon Graphics, Sun Microsystems and Red Hat.

By mid-2004, five major lawsuits had been filed:

 SCO v. IBM
 Red Hat v. SCO
 SCO v. Novell (not directly related to Linux, the suit has more to do with Unix copyrights)
 SCO v. DaimlerChrysler
 SCO v. AutoZone

In cases, SCO publicly implied that a number of other parties have committed copyright infringement, including not only Linux developers, but also Linux users.

UNIX SVRx
SCO's claims are derived from several contracts that may have transferred UNIX System V Release 4 intellectual property assets. The UNIX IP rights originated with Unix System Laboratories (USL), a division of AT&T. In 1993, USL sold all UNIX rights and assets to Novell, including copyrights, trademarks, and active licensing contracts. Some of these rights and assets, plus additional assets derived from Novell's development work, were then sold to the Santa Cruz Operation in 1995. The Santa Cruz Operation had developed and was selling a PC-based UNIX until 2000, when it then resold its UNIX assets to Caldera Systems, which later reorganized into Caldera International and changed its name to SCO Group.

Through this chain of sales, SCO claims to be the "owner of UNIX". The validity of these claims is hotly contested by others. SCO claims copyright to all UNIX code developed by USL, referred to as SVRx, and licensing contracts originating with AT&T, saying that these are inherited through the same chain of sales. The primary document SCO presents as evidence of these claims is the "Asset Purchase Agreement", defining the sale between Novell and the Santa Cruz Operation. SCO says that this includes all copyrights to the UNIX code base and contractual rights to the licensing base. The other parties disagree.

UNIX copyrights ownership
The status of copyrights from USL is murky, since UNIX code is a compilation of elements with different copyright histories. Some code was released without copyright notice before the Copyright Act of 1976 made copyright automatic. This code may be in the public domain and not subject to copyright claims. Other code is affected by the USL v. BSDi case, and is covered by the BSD License.

Groklaw uncovered an old settlement made between Unix System Laboratories (USL) and The University of California in the case of USL v. BSDi. This settlement ended a copyright infringement suit against the university for making BSD source code freely available that USL felt infringed their copyrights. The university filed a counter suit, saying that USL had taken BSD source code and put it in UNIX without properly acknowledging the university's copyright. This settlement muddies the question of SCO's ownership of major parts of the UNIX source code. This uncertainty is particularly significant in regard to SCO's claims against Linux, which uses some BSD code.

Novell challenges SCO's interpretation of the purchase agreement. In response to a letter SCO sent to 1500 companies on May 12, 2003, Novell exchanged a series of letters with SCO beginning in May 2003, claiming that the copyrights for the core UNIX System V were not included in the asset purchase agreement and are retained by Novell. In October 2003, Novell registered those copyrights with the US Copyright Office.

In response to these challenges from Novell, SCO filed a "slander of title" suit against Novell, SCO v. Novell. This claimed that Novell was interfering with their business activities by clouding the ownership of UNIX copyrights. SCO's claim for special damages was dismissed on June 9, 2004, for "failure to specifically plead special damages." However, SCO was given 30 days "to amend its complaint to more specifically plead special damages". In the same ruling, the judge stated that it was questionable whether or not the Asset Purchase Agreement transferred the relevant copyrights, reasoning that the ASA amendment by which SCO was claiming to have acquired those rights contained no transfer language in the form of "seller hereby conveys to buyer" and that it used ambiguous language when it came to the question of when and how and which rights were to be transferred.

SCO filed an amended complaint. In late July, 2005, Novell filed an answer to SCO's complaint, denying all of its accusations. Novell also filed its own Slander of Title counter-lawsuit against SCO. Novell has also filed claims for numerous breaches of the APA (Asset Purchase Agreement) between Novell and the Santa Cruz Operation. Under the APA, Santa Cruz (and later SCO after SCO purchased Santa Cruz Operation's Unix Business) was given the right to market and sell Unixware as a product, retaining 100% of all revenues. Santa Cruz Operation (and later SCO) also was given the responsibility of administering Unix SVR4 license agreements on behalf of Novell. When money was paid for licensing, SCO was to turn over 100% of the revenue to Novell, and then Novell would return 5% as an Administration Fee. Novell claims that SCO signed Unix SVR4 licensing agreements with Microsoft and Sun Microsystems, as well as with numerous Linux End Users for Unix IP allegedly in the Linux Kernel, and then refused to turn the money over to Novell. Novell is suing for 100% of the revenue, claiming SCO is not entitled to the 5% administration fee since they breached their contract with Novell. Novell's counterclaims proposed asking the court to put appropriate funds from SCO into escrow until the case is resolved, since SCO's cash is diminishing quickly.

Novell also retained the right to audit SCO's Unix Licensing Business under the APA. Novell claims that SCO has not turned over vital information about the Microsoft, Sun, and Linux End User License Agreements, despite repeated demands by Novell for them to do so. Novell, in another claim that is part of their counter suit, is asking the court to compel SCO to allow Novell to perform this audit of SCO's Unix Business.

On August 10, 2007, Judge Dale Kimball, hearing the SCO v. Novell case, ruled that "the court concludes that Novell is the owner of the UNIX and UnixWare Copyrights".

License administration standing
The Novell to Santa Cruz Operation Asset Purchase Agreement also involved the administration of some 6000 standing licensing agreements between various UNIX users and the previous owners. These licensees include universities, software corporations and computer hardware companies. SCO's claimed ownership of the licenses has become an issue in three aspects of the SCO–Linux controversies. The first was the cancellation of IBM's license, the second was SCO's complaint against DaimlerChrysler (see SCO v. DaimlerChrysler), and the third is the derivative works claim of the SCO v. IBM case.

In May 2003, SCO canceled IBM's SVRx license to its version of UNIX, AIX. This was based on SCO's claim of unrestricted ownership of the System V licensing contracts inherited from USL. IBM ignored the license cancellation, claiming that an amendment to the original license made it "irrevocable". In addition, as part of the Purchase Agreement, Novell retained certain rights of control over the administration of the licenses which were sold, including rights to act on SCO's behalf in some cases. Novell exercised one of these rights by revoking SCO's cancellation of the IBM license. SCO disputed the validity of both of these actions, and amended its SCO v. IBM complaint to include copyright infringement, based on IBM's continued sale and use of AIX without a valid SVRx license.

In December 2003, SCO demanded that all UNIX licensees certify some items, some related to the use of Linux, that were not provided for in the license agreement language. Since DaimlerChrysler failed to respond, SCO filed the SCO v. DaimlerChrysler suit in March 2004. All claims related to the certification demands were summarily dismissed by the court.

Control of derivative works
The third issue based on the UNIX licensees agreement is related to SCO's claims of control of derivative works.

Many UNIX licensees have added features to the core UNIX SVRx system and those new features contain computer code not in the original SVRx code base. In most cases, software copyright is owned by the person or company that develops the code. SCO, however, claims that the original licensing agreements define this new code as a derivative work. They also claim that they have the right to control and restrict the use and distribution of that new code.

These claims are the basis of SCO v. IBM. SCO's initial complaint, said that IBM violated the original licensing agreement by not maintaining confidentiality with the new code, developed and copyrighted by IBM, and releasing it to the Linux project.

IBM claims that the license agreement (noted in the $Echo newsletter of April 1985) and subsequent licenses defines derivative works as the developer's property. This leaves IBM free to do as it wishes with its new code. In August 2004, IBM filed a motion for partial summary judgment. The motion stated that IBM has the right to do as it wishes with software not part of the original SVRx code. In February 2005, the motion was dismissed as premature, because discovery was not yet complete. IBM refiled this motion along with other summary judgment motions as noted below in September 2006.

SCO allegations of copyright and trade secret violations
SCO claims that Linux infringes SCO's copyright, trade secrets, and contractual rights. This claim is fundamental to the SCOsource program, where SCO has demanded that Linux users obtain licenses from SCOsource to be properly licensed to use the code in question. Exactly which parts of Linux are involved remains unclear as many of their claims are still under seal in the SCO v. IBM lawsuit.

SCO originally claimed in SCO v. IBM that IBM had violated trade secrets. But these alleged violations by IBM would not have involved Linux distributors or end users. SCO's trade secret claims were dropped by SCO in their amended complaint.

SCO also claimed line-for-line literal copying of code from UNIX code files to Linux kernel files and obfuscated copying of code, but originally refused to publicly identify which code was in violation. SCO submitted to the court evidence of their claims under seal but much of it was excluded from the case after it was challenged by IBM as not meeting the specificity requirements to be included.

These examples have fallen into two groups. The first are segments of files or whole files alleged to originate in UNIX SVRx code such as the errno.h header file. The second group are files and materials contributed by IBM that originated with IBM development work associated with AIX and Dynix, IBM's two UNIX products.

Each of these has a different set of issues. In order for copyright to be violated, several conditions must be met. First, the claimant must be able to show that they own the copyrights for the material in question. Second, all or a significant part of the source must be present in the infringing material. There must be enough similarity to show direct copying of material.

SVRx code allegedly in Linux
The issue of ownership of the SVRx code base was discussed above. Besides the unresolved issue of what was actually transferred from Novell to Santa Cruz Operation, there are also the portions of the SVRx code base that are covered by BSD copyrights or that are in the public domain.

SCO's first public disclosure of what they claimed is infringing code was at its SCO Forum conference in August 2003 at the MGM Grand Las Vegas. The first, known as the Berkeley Packet Filter, was distributed under the BSD License and is freely usable by anyone. The second example was related to memory allocation functions, also released under the BSD License. It is no longer in the Linux code base.

SCO has also claimed that code related to application programming interfaces was copied from UNIX. However, this code and the underlying standards they describe are in the public domain and are also covered by rights USL sold to The Open Group. A later claim was made to code segments related to ELF file format standards. This material was developed by the Tool Interface Standard (TIS) Committee and placed in the public domain. SCO claims that the TIS Committee had no authority to place ELF in the public domain, even though SCO's predecessor in interest was a member of the committee.

SCO has claimed that some are violating UNIX SVRx copyrights by putting UNIX code into Linux. They may or may not have brought this claim directly in any of their cases. The IBM case is about derivative works, not SVRx code (see below). The Novell case is about copyright ownership. DaimlerChrysler was about contractual compliance statements.

The "may or may not" comes from AutoZone's case. In AutoZone, SCO's complaint claimed damages for AutoZone's use of Linux. However, when objecting to AutoZone's request for a stay pending the IBM case, SCO apparently contradicted their written complaint, claiming that the case was entirely about AutoZone copying certain libraries (outside the Linux kernel) from a UNIX system to a Linux-based system to facilitate moving an internal application to the Linux platform faster; SCO's original complaint does not appear to mention these libraries. AutoZone denies having done this with UNIX libraries. If SCO's oral description of their case is the correct one, then their AutoZone claim has nothing to do with the Linux kernel or the actions of any distributors.

The copyright issue is addressed directly in two of the cases. The first is by IBM in their counterclaim in SCO v. IBM. The issue is central to a pending motion by IBM, stating that IBM violated no copyrights in its Linux related activities. It is also addressed by Red Hat in the Red Hat v. SCO case. Red Hat claims that SCO's statements about infringement in Linux are unproven and untrue, damaging to them and violates the Lanham Act. Red Hat asks for an injunction to stop claims of violations without proof. They also ask for a judgment that they violated no SCO copyrights. A hearing on the IBM motion was held on September 15, 2004. Judge Kimball took the motion under advisement. The Red Hat case is on hold.

Allegations of reverse copying
EWeek has reported allegations that SCO may have copied parts of the Linux kernel into SCO UNIX as part of its Linux Kernel Personality feature. If true, this would mean that SCO is guilty of a breach of the Linux kernel copyrights. SCO has denied this allegation, but according to Groklaw, one SCO employee confirmed it in a deposition.

IBM code in Linux
SCO has claimed a number of instances of IBM Linux code as breaches of contract. These examples include code related to symmetric multiprocessing (SMP), Journaled File System (JFS), Read-copy-update (RCU) and Non-Uniform Memory Access (NUMA). This code is questionably in the Linux kernel, and may have been added by IBM through the normal kernel submission process. This code was developed and copyrighted by IBM. IBM added features to AIX and Dynix.

SCO claims that they have "control rights" to this due to their licensing agreements with IBM. SCO disavows claiming that they own the code IBM wrote, rather comparing their "control rights" to an easement, rights which allow them to prohibit IBM from publicizing the code they wrote, even though IBM owns the copyrights. They base this claim on language in the original license agreement that requires non-disclosure of the code and claim that all code developed by UNIX licensees that is used with the code under license be held in confidence. This claim is discussed above at Control of derivative works.

SCO and the GPL
Before changing their name to the SCO Group, the company was known as Caldera International.

Caldera was one of the major distributors of Linux between 1994 and 1998. In August 1998, the company split into Caldera Systems and Caldera Thin Clients, with Caldera Systems taking over the Linux systems business and Caldera Thin Clients concentrating on the Thin Clients and embedded business. The parent and shell company Caldera, Inc. ceased to exist in 2000 after a settlement with Microsoft in the Caldera v. Microsoft lawsuit.

Caldera Systems was reorganized to become Caldera International in 2001, the company, which was renamed to The SCO Group in 2002.

Some, like Eben Moglen, have suggested that because Caldera distributed the allegedly infringing code under the GNU General Public License (GPL), that this act would license any proprietary code in Linux.

SCO has stated that they did not know their own code was in Linux, so releasing it under the GPL does not count. However, as late as July and August 2006, long after that claim was made, they were still distributing ELF files (the subject of one of SCO's claims regarding SVRx) under the GPL.

SCO has also claimed, in early stages of the litigation, that the GPL is invalid and non-binding and legally unenforceable. In response, supporters of the GPL, such as Eben Moglen, claimed that SCO's right to distribute Linux relied upon the GPL being a valid copyright license. Later court filings by the SCO Group in SCO v. IBM use SCO's alleged compliance with the license as a defense to IBM's counterclaims.

The GPL has become an issue in SCO v. IBM. Under U.S. copyright law, distribution of creative works whose copyright is owned by another party is illegal without permission from the copyright owner, usually in the form of a license; the GPL is such a license, and thus allows distribution, but only under limited conditions. Since IBM released the relevant code under the terms of the GPL, it claims that the only permission that SCO has to copy and distribute IBM's code in Linux is under the terms and conditions of the GPL, one of which requires the distributor to "accept" the GPL. IBM says that SCO violated the GPL by denouncing the GPL's validity, and by claiming that the GPL violates the U.S. Constitution, together with copyright, antitrust and export control laws. IBM also claims that SCO's SCOsource program is incompatible with the requirement that redistributions of GPLed works must be free of copyright licensing fees (fees may be charged for the acts of duplication and support). IBM has brought counterclaims alleging that SCO has violated the GPL and breached IBM's copyrights by collecting licensing fees while distributing IBM's copyrighted material.

Status of current lawsuits

SCO v. IBM

On March 7, 2003, SCO filed suit against IBM. Initially this lawsuit was about breach of contract and trade secrets. Later, SCO dropped the trade secrets claim, so the claim is breach of contract. SCO also added a copyright claim related to IBM's continued use of AIX, but not related to Linux. The judge subsequently stated that the SCO Group had indeed made a claim of copyright infringement against IBM regarding Linux. IBM filed multiple counter claims, including charges of both patent violations, which were later dropped, and violation of copyright law.

On February 8, 2005, Judge Kimball ruled that IBM's motions for summary judgment were premature but added:
Viewed against the backdrop of SCO's plethora of public statements concerning IBM's and others' infringement of SCO's purported copyrights to the UNIX software, it is astonishing that SCO has not offered any competent evidence to create a disputed fact regarding whether IBM has infringed SCO's alleged copyrights through IBM's Linux activities.

On June 28, 2006, Judge Brooke Wells granted, in part, IBM's motion to limit SCO's claims and excluded 186 of SCO's 294 items of allegedly misused intellectual property (IBM had challenged 201 of them for various reasons). Wells cited a number of factors including SCO's inability to provide sufficient specificity in these claims:
In December 2003, near the beginning of this case, the court ordered SCO to, "identify and state with specificity the source code(s) that SCO is claiming forms the basis of their action against IBM." Even if SCO lacked the code behind methods and concepts at this early stage, SCO could have and should have, at least articulated which methods and concepts formed "the basis of their action against IBM." At a minimum, SCO should have identified the code behind their method and concepts in the final submission pursuant to this original order entered in December 2003 and Judge Kimball’s order entered in July 2005.

This left about 100 of SCO's items of allegedly misused intellectual property (the merits of which have not yet been judged), out of 294 items originally disclosed by SCO.

Following the partial summary judgment rulings in the SCO v. Novell Slander of Title case, Judge Kimball asked the parties in SCO v IBM to prepare by August 31, 2007, a statement of the status of this case.

Red Hat v. SCO

Red Hat filed suit against SCO on August 4, 2003. Red Hat sued SCO for false advertising, deceptive trade practices and asked for a declaratory judgment of noninfringement of any of SCO's copyrights. This case has been stayed pending resolution of the IBM case.

SCO v. Novell

After SCO initiated their Linux campaign, they said that they were the owners of UNIX. Novell claimed these statements were false, and that they still owned the rights in question. After Novell registered the copyrights to some key UNIX products, SCO filed suit against Novell on January 20, 2004. Novell removed the suit to federal court on February 6, 2004.

On July 29, 2005, Novell filed its answer with the court, denying SCO's claims. Novell also filed counterclaims asking the court to force SCO to turn over the revenues it had received from UNIX licenses, less a 5% administrative fee. Additionally, Novell asked the court to place the funds in a "constructive trust" in order to ensure that SCO could pay Novell since the company's assets were depleting rapidly.

On August 10, 2007, Judge Dale Kimball, hearing the SCO v. Novell case, ruled that "the court concludes that Novell is the owner of the UNIX and UnixWare Copyrights". Novell was awarded summary judgments on a number of claims, and a number of SCO claims were denied. SCO was instructed to account for and pass to Novell an appropriate portion of income relating to SCOSource licences to Sun Microsystems and Microsoft. A number of matters are not disposed of by Judge Kimball's ruling, and the outcome of these are still pending.

On July 16, 2008, the trial court issued an order awarding Novell $2,547,817 and ruled that SCO was not authorized to enter into the 2003 agreement with Sun. On November 20, 2008, final judgment in the case affirmed the August 10 ruling, and added interest of $918,122 plus $489 per diem after August 29, 2008, along with a constructive trust of $625,486.90.

On August 24, 2009, the U.S. Court of Appeals for the Tenth Circuit partially reversed the August 10, 2007 district court summary judgment ruling. The appeals court remanded back to trial on the issues of copyright ownership and Novell's contractual waiver rights. The court upheld the $2,547,817 award granted to Novell for the 2003 Sun agreement. On March 30, 2010, after a three-week trial before Judge Ted Stewart, a jury returned a verdict "confirming Novell's ownership of the Unix copyrights."

On June 10, 2010, Judge Ted Stewart denied SCO's motion for another trial and ruled for Novell on all remaining issues.

On July 7, 2010, SCO appealed the new judgments to the United States Court of Appeals for the Tenth Circuit.

On August 30, 2011, the Tenth Circuit Court of Appeals affirmed the District Court ruling in its entirety, rejecting SCO's attempt to re-argue the case before the Court of Appeals.

SCO v. AutoZone
AutoZone, a corporate user of Linux and former user of SCO OpenServer, was sued by SCO on March 3, 2004. SCO claims AutoZone violated SCO's copyrights by using Linux. The suit was stayed pending the resolution of the IBM, Red Hat and Novell cases.

On September 26, 2008, Judge Robert C. Jones lifted the stay, effective December 31, 2008. He initially scheduled discovery for April 9, 2010. SCO filed an amended complaint on August 14, 2009. On August 31, 2009, AutoZone replied, and filed a motion to dismiss in part.

On October 22, 2009, Edward Cahn, SCO's Chapter 11 trustee, sought bankruptcy court approval for an agreement he reached with AutoZone. According to the court filings, the confidential settlement resolves all claims between SCO and AutoZone.

SCO v. DaimlerChrysler

In December 2003, SCO demanded that some UNIX licensees certify certain issues regarding their use of Linux. DaimlerChrysler, a former UNIX user and current Linux user, did not respond to this demand. On March 3, 2004, SCO filed suit against DaimlerChrysler for violating their UNIX license agreement by failing to respond to the certification request. Almost every claim SCO made has been ruled against in summary judgment. The last remaining issue, that of whether DaimlerChrysler made a timely response, was dismissed by agreement of SCO and DaimlerChrysler in December 2004. SCO retains the right to continue this case at a future date, providing it pays legal fees to DaimlerChrysler.

Other issues and conflicts

SCO announces that it will not sue its own customers
On June 23, 2003, SCO sent out a letter announcing that it would not be suing its own Linux customers. In the letter, it states:

SCO and SGI
In August 2003, SCO presented two examples of what they claimed was illegal copying of copyrighted code from UNIX to Linux. One of the examples (Berkeley Packet Filter) was not related to original UNIX code at all. The other example did, however, seem to originate from the UNIX code and was apparently contributed by a UNIX vendor, Silicon Graphics. However, an analysis by the Linux community later revealed that:

 The code originated from an even older version of UNIX which at some point was published by Caldera, thus making any claim of copyright infringement shaky.
 The code did not do anything. It was in a part of the Linux kernel that was written in anticipation of a Silicon Graphics architecture that was never released.
 It had already been removed from the kernel two months earlier.
 The contested segment was small (80 lines) and trivial.

SCO and BayStar Capital
In October 2003, BayStar Capital and Royal Bank of Canada invested US$50 million in The SCO Group to support the legal cost of SCO's Linux campaign. Later it was shown that BayStar was referred to SCO by Microsoft, whose proprietary Windows operating system competes with Linux. In 2003, BayStar looked at SCO on the recommendation of Microsoft, according to Lawrence R. Goldfarb, managing partner of BayStar Capital: "It was evident that Microsoft had an agenda".

On April 22, 2004, The New York Times reported that BayStar Capital, a private hedge fund which had arranged for $50M in funding for SCO in October 2003, was asking for its $20M back. The remainder of the $50M was from Royal Bank of Canada. SCO stated in their press release that they believed that BayStar did not have grounds for making this demand.

On August 27, 2004, SCO and BayStar resolved their dispute.

SCO and Canopy Group
The Canopy Group is an investment group with shares in a trust of different companies. It is a group owned by the Noorda family, also founders of Novell.

Until February 2005, Canopy held SCO shares, and the management of SCO held shares of Canopy. The two parties became embroiled in a bitter dispute when the Noorda family sought to oust board member Ralph Yarro III on claims of misappropriation. With internal problems not made public (which included the suicides of Canopy's director of information systems, Robert Penrose, and Val Kriedel, the daughter of Ray Noorda), the Canopy Group agreed to buy back all the shares that SCO had in Canopy in exchange for their SCO shares and cash.

SCO and Canopy Group are now mostly independent, though SCO continues to rent their Utah office space from Canopy.

Microsoft funding of SCO controversy
On March 4, 2004, a leaked SCO internal e-mail detailed how Microsoft had raised up to $106 million via the BayStar referral and other means. Blake Stowell of SCO confirmed the memo was real, but claimed it to be "a misunderstanding". BayStar claimed the deal was suggested by Microsoft, but that no money for it came directly from them.
In addition to the Baystar involvement, Microsoft paid SCO $6M (USD) in May 2003 for a license to "Unix and Unix-related patents", despite the lack of Unix-related patents owned by SCO. License deals between both companies may have reached at least $16M (USD) according to U.S. Securities and Exchange Commission (SEC) filings. This deal was widely seen in the press as a boost to SCO's finances which would help SCO with its lawsuit against IBM.

SCOsource
After their initial claim of copyright infringement in the Linux kernel, The SCO Group started their SCOsource initiative, which sells licenses of SCO's claimed copyrighted software, other than OpenServer and Unixware licenses. After a small number of high-profile sales (including one that was denied by the claimed purchaser), SCO claimed to offer corporate users of Linux a license at US$699 per processor running Linux. However, many individuals have found it impossible to buy such a license from SCO. SCO says that participants of the SCOsource initiative are not liable for any claims that SCO makes against Linux users.

The Michael Davidson E-Mail
On July 14, 2005, an email was unsealed that had been sent from Michael Davidson to Reg Broughton (both Caldera International employees) in 2002, before many of the lawsuits. In it, Davidson reported how the company had hired an outside consultant because (spelling as in the original):

The consultant was to review the Linux code and compare it to Unix source code, to find possible copyright infringement. Davidson himself said that he had not expected to find anything significant based on his own knowledge of the code and had voiced his opinion that it was "a waste of time". After 4 to 6 months of consultant's work, Davidson says:

See also

 Timeline of SCO-Linux controversies
 Copyfraud
 Association of Licensed Automobile Manufacturers (ALAM) - similar attempt to sue buyers of automobiles

References

External links
The SCO Group- Official website
Free Software Foundation position regarding SCO's attacks 6 essays, by Eben Moglen, Richard Stallman, and Bradley Kuhn
Groklaw - An online community dedicated to following the progress of the various lawsuits and investigating the claims SCO makes
Tuxrocks - An archive of court documents related to the various lawsuits

SCO Controversy Timeline
SCO:Without Fear and Without Research
Linux's lucky lawsuit - Why the SCO lawsuit is a good thing in the long run
The Michael Davidson Email
Novell hits back at SCO in Unix dispute
Fact and fiction in the Microsoft-SCO relationship
Linus Torvalds explains to Groklaw that he was the original author of code that SCO claims to have authored

 
Computing-related controversies and disputes
Intellectual property law

sv:SCOs rättstvister